Changer is an Icelandic death metal / metalcore band, formed in 1999. The band has released three albums and three EPs.

History
Changer was founded in October 1999 in Akureyri, Iceland, by drummer Kristján B. Heiðarsson, as a one-man project. Kristján wrote and recorded the band's first album, January 109, in January 2000. The recordings were handled by his friend Aðalsteinn Már Björnssson, who soon after was killed in a car accident. The album was released on February 29, 2000.

In May 2000, Kristján moved to Reykjavík and started assembling a full band. A full line-up was established in late 2000. Changer began playing gigs in Iceland in 2001, and traveled to Akureyri in the spring to record an EP, Inconsistency, which consisted of two new songs along with reworkings of two songs from January 109; it was released in July 2001.

Recording for the next album began in late December 2002, but Scenes was not released until February 13, 2004.

In 2005, Changer played overseas for the first time, at Nevelfest in Antwerp, Belgium. Shortly after coming home again, major line-up changes took place in the band.

Changer started rehearsing and writing new material, and in May 2006 the band toured Belgium, the Netherlands, and Germany. A new EP, Breed the Lies, was released on June 1, 2006. Mixed and mastered by Tue Madsen at Antfarm Studios, Denmark, the EP was placed at number 16-20 on the Icelandic Grapevine as one of the best albums of Iceland for 2006. Later in 2006, the band toured Iceland in support of Cannibal Corpse and Rotting Christ at Eistnaflug. Also during this time, they were featured in a web series which focuses on the Icelandic scene called 'Sleepless in Reykjavik' in which their music video for "Recaptured Sanity" was used in the first episode. In August 2007, Gisli parted ways with the band and looked for a new bassist to replace him. Jón Karl soon joined, though only for a short time and then Atli Jarl Martin joined as permanent bassist.

Changer planned to travel abroad to record their next album; however, in November 2007 the band unexpectedly broke up. They planned to release the demos from 2006 and 2007 in the near future. As of 2008, the band has reformed by founder Kristján. In 2010, Changer released their third full-length entitled Darkling.

In 2021 the band got back together for a reunion gig and following a studio session and released their first song in 12 years in early 2021. They subsequently released EP called Pledge of the Dying in 2022.

Band members
 Kristján B. Heiðarsson – drums (1999–2007, 2008–present)
 Hörður Halldórsson – guitar (2000–2005, 2008–present)
 Hlynur Örn - [Vocal] (2022-)
 Unnar Sigurðsson – guitar (2006–2007, 2021-)
 Magnús Halldór Pálsson - [bass guitar] (2021-)

Former members
 Valdimar Olsen - guitar (2000)
 Snorri Óttarsson – bass guitar (2000–2001)
 Jóhann Ingi Sigurðsson – guitar (2000–2007)
 Engilbert Hauksson – bass guitar (2001–2005)
 Magnús Atli Magnússon – vocals (2001–2005)
 Fannar Þórsson – guitar (2005–2006)
 Gísli Sigmundsson – bass guitar, vocals (2005–2007)
 Egill Geirsson – vocals (2005–2007)
 Atli Jarl Martin – vocals, bass guitar (2008–2009)
 Haraldur Anton Skúlason - vocals (2009–2011)
 Rob-D – guitar (2008–2011)
 Arnar M. Ellertsson – bass guitar (2009–2011)

Session members
 Magnús Halldór Pálsson - bass guitar (2001)
 Hörður Ólafsson – bass guitar, vocals (2005)
 Jón Karl Jónsson – bass guitar (2007)

Timeline

Discography

Albums
January 109 (2000)
Scenes (2004)
Darkling (2010)
Pledge of the Dying (2022)

EPs
Inconsistency (2001)
Breed the Lies (2006)

Singles
Three to one  (Inconsistency) (2021)

References

External links
Changer's official website
Changer at MySpace

Icelandic death metal musical groups
Metalcore musical groups
Musical groups established in 1999
Musical quintets
Musical groups from Reykjavík
1999 establishments in Iceland